Hodalen is a village in Tolga Municipality in Innlandet county, Norway. Hodalen Church has been located in the village since 1936.

The mountain Håmmålsfjellet lies just to the north of the village, and south of the valley lies the Raudsjøheimen mountain range. The Hola river begins at lake Nordersjøen on the south side of the village. The river runs to the southeast through several small lakes near the village including: Drengen, Asmaren, Stikkilen, and Storsjøen before the river heads to the southeast.

In the 18th century, there were trials between the local villagers and farmers from Tynset concerning fishing rights in the local lakes.

References

Tolga, Norway
Villages in Innlandet